The pair skating event was held over two days. On February 3 at 17:00 the short program was held while the free skating took place on February 5 at 20:15.

Schedule
All times are Almaty Time (UTC+06:00)

Results
Legend
WD — Withdrawn

References

Results

External links
 Official website

Pairs